Brenton Joe Birmingham (born November 29, 1972) is an American and Icelandic former professional basketball player who for the majority of his career played in the Úrvalsdeild karla. He won the Icelandic championship three times and was voted the Icelandic Basketball Player of the Year in 2006 and Úrvalsdeild domestic player of the year in 2007.

Basketball

College career
Birmingham started his college career with Brooklyn College but after it announced it was abandoning its basketball program in the spring of 1992, he transferred to Manhattan College. In two seasons with the Jaspers he averaged 13.4 points per game. He was elected to the Jaspers' Hall of Fame in 2010.

Club career
Birmingham started his professional career in 1995, when he was a late-season addition to Korisliiga club Tapiolan Honka. In 5 games for Honka, he averaged 22.0 points and 4.8 rebounds per game. He spent the majority of his career in the Icelandic Úrvalsdeild karla with Njarðvík and Grindavík, but also played for Rueil Pro Basket in France and the London Towers in England. He twice posted a quadruple-double in the Úrvalsdeild playoffs. On 16 March 2020, Birmingham had 17 points, 14 rebounds, 10 assists and 10 steals for Grindavík in a first round victory against Keflavík. A year later, on 17 April 2001, he had 28 points, 10 rebounds, 11 assists and 11 steals in the championship clinching victory against Tindastóll in the Úrvalsdeild finals.

Icelandic national team
Birmingham played 19 games for the Icelandic National Basketball team between 2002 and 2007. In 2007, he helped Iceland winning gold in basketball at the Games of the Small States of Europe.

Acting career
In the late nineties, Birmingham auditioned for He got game. In 1999, he appeared in Game Day, starring Richard Lewis.

Personal life
Birmingham lives in Njarðvík in southwestern Iceland with his wife and four children, and works as an air traffic controller at Keflavík Airport.

References

External links 
Icelandic competitions statistics (2007–present) at Icelandic Basketball Association
Korisliiga statistics at korisliiga.fi
Profile at Sports Reference
Úrvalsdeild statistics (1998–2007) at Icelandic Basketball Association
Eurobasket.com player profile
Stats in France
 

1972 births
Living people
Icelandic men's basketball players
American expatriate basketball people in Iceland
American men's basketball players
American emigrants to Iceland
American expatriate basketball people in Finland
American expatriate basketball people in France
Basketball players from New York (state)
Brooklyn College alumni
Grindavík men's basketball players
Guards (basketball)
Brenton Birmingham
Brenton Birmingham
Brenton Birmingham
Njarðvík men's basketball players
Úrvalsdeild karla (basketball) players